The Liverpool Art Prize is contemporary art competition open to professional artists based in the Liverpool City Region area of the United Kingdom.

Background
The inaugural competition took place in 2008.
The competition was inspired by the Turner Prize held in Liverpool in 2007 at the Tate Gallery.
The Liverpool Art Prize is organised by www.artinliverpool.com

Winners and Shortlisted artists
 2008 - Exhibition 29 February 2008 to 7 May 2008
 Imogen Stidworthy - Overall Winner
 The Singh Twins - People's choice Winner
 Emma Rodgers
 Mary Fitzpatrick
 Jayne Lawless
 2009 - Exhibition 13 March 2009 to 4 May 2009 - Winners announced on 22 April 2009
 AL and AL - Overall Winners
 Terry Duffy
 McCoy Wynne
 Nicki McCubbing
 Richard Meaghan
 Elizabeth Willow - People's Choice Winner
 2010 - Exhibition 4 June 2010 to 10 July 2010 - Winner announced on 30 June 2010
 David Jacques - Overall Winner
 James Quin - People's Choice Winner
 Paul Rooney (artist)
 Emily Speed
 Gina Czarnecki
2011 - Exhibition 6 May 2011 to 11 June 2011 - Winner announced on 1 June 2011
 Brendon Lyons
 Bernadette O'Toole
 Richard Proffitt
 Markus Soukup

References

External links
 Liverpool Art Prize Website
 Liverpool Art Prize winners 2009
The Liverpool Art Prize 2014

Liverpool